The 1928–29 Montreal Canadiens season was the team's 20th season, and 12th in the National Hockey League (NHL). The team repeated its first-place finish in the Canadian Division and qualified for the playoffs. The Canadiens lost in the semi-finals against the Boston Bruins.

Regular season

The New York Americans, last place finishers in 1927–28, surprised everyone by occupying first place for much of the season in the Canadian Division. However, the Montreal Canadiens dislodged the Americans and finished first. George Hainsworth, Canadiens goaltender, set an unprecedented record of 22 shutouts and a 0.98 goals against average.

Final standings

Record vs. opponents

Schedule and results

Playoffs
The Canadiens received a first-round bye and met the Boston Bruins in the semi-finals. In a best-of-five series, the Bruins defeated the Canadiens in three straight. The games were very defensive, Boston scoring five goals in the three games, Montreal only two.

Player statistics

Regular season
Scoring

Goaltending

Playoffs
Scoring

Goaltending

Awards and records
 O'Brien Cup – First place in Canadian division.

Transactions

See also
1928–29 NHL season

References

Montreal Canadiens seasons
Montreal
Montreal